James Fullarton (born 20 July 1974) is a Scottish professional football manager and former player who recently left Walsall FC

Fullarton played for several clubs in Scotland, France and England, including St Mirren, Bastia, Crystal Palace, Bolton Wanderers, Dundee United, Brentford and Southend United. He was briefly the manager of Notts County in 2016, but was dismissed after 12 games in charge. He managed National League club  F.C. Halifax Town from February 2018 to July 2019.

Playing career
Fullarton won 18 Scotland under-21 caps, captaining the side at the 1996 under-21 European Championship, where they reached the semi-finals.

He spent the first six years of his career with St Mirren before moving to French side SC Bastia in 1996. After a year with Les Bleus, he moved to Crystal Palace, where he managed nearly 80 appearances in three years. At Palace he scored once; his goal coming in a 1–1 Premier League draw with Coventry City on 24 September 1997.

After a short loan spell with Bolton Wanderers, Fullarton moved back to Scotland with Dundee United, although injury restricted him to only 20 appearances during his two years at Tannadice. It was at United in November 2000 that he received a serious injury, where a dislocation and double break of the ankle resulted in nearly ten minutes of on-field treatment. The injury was so severe that Fullarton was close to having his foot amputated.

After his release from United, Fullarton made 37 appearances for Brentford where he scored on his debut against Huddersfield Town. He then moved to Southend United where after 17 appearances he suffered a serious knee injury at Chesterfield which required total reconstruction. He retired in 2005 after an attempted comeback in Singapore with Woodlands Wellington, failed.

Coaching career
Fullarton moved to Spain where he set up his own football academy, running teams from under-8 to under-19, playing against Spanish lower league professional club's academies. Seven years on the academy is still running with over 200 players in the system and a number having graduated to sign for professional clubs in both Spain and England.

In July 2011, Fullarton took over as Youth Team Coach at Bristol Rovers.

However, in the summer of 2012, he became the coach of the Bolton Wanderers under-21s from where he was released by mutual consent in October 2014, following the departure of manager, Dougie Freedman. Fullarton still oversees his football academy, Costa Unida, in Spain.

Managerial career
On 10 January 2016, he was unveiled as manager of League Two club Notts County. Fullarton was dismissed by Notts County on 19 March 2016, following a 4–1 home defeat to Exeter City.

On 20 February 2018, Fullarton was announced as the new manager of F.C. Halifax Town, following the departure of Billy Heath. His first game in charge was an away game against Eastleigh on 24 February. Fullarton resigned as Halifax manager on 15 July 2019, after leading the team to a 16th-place finish in the 2018–19 National League.

Managerial statistics

References

External links

1974 births
Living people
Scottish footballers
Scotland under-21 international footballers
Association football midfielders
St Mirren F.C. players
SC Bastia players
Crystal Palace F.C. players
Bolton Wanderers F.C. players
Dundee United F.C. players
Brentford F.C. players
Southend United F.C. players
Chesterfield F.C. players
Bristol Rovers F.C. non-playing staff
Crystal Palace F.C. non-playing staff
Bolton Wanderers F.C. non-playing staff
Nottingham Forest F.C. non-playing staff
Premier League players
Scottish Football League players
Scottish Premier League players
Scottish football managers
Notts County F.C. managers
FC Halifax Town managers
English Football League managers
National League (English football) managers
Walsall F.C. non-playing staff